Sir Anthony John Charles Meyer, 3rd Baronet (27 October 1920 – 24 December 2004) was a British soldier, diplomat, and Conservative and later Liberal Democrat politician, best known for standing against Margaret Thatcher for the party leadership in 1989. In spite of his staunch conservative views on economic policy, his passionate support of increased British integration into the European Union led to him becoming increasingly marginalised in Thatcher's Conservative Party.

After being deselected as a Conservative parliamentary candidate for the 1992 general election, Meyer became policy director of the European Movement, and in 1998 he joined the Pro-Euro Conservative Party.  After that disbanded in 2001, he became a member of the Liberal Democrats.

Early life
Meyer was the son of Marjorie Amy Georgina (née Seeley) and Sir Frank Cecil Meyer. His father was vice-chairman of the De Beers diamond company, and from 1924 to 1929 he was Conservative Member of Parliament for Great Yarmouth, Norfolk. His father was from a Jewish family. His grandfather, Sir Carl Meyer, 1st Baronet, was born in Hamburg, Germany; he migrated to Britain in the late 19th century, when he worked for the Rothschilds, and later for De Beers; he eventually became Governor of the National Bank of Egypt and was given a baronetcy for the large donations he made to found a National Theatre in Britain.

Education and war service
Meyer was educated at Sandroyd School in Wiltshire before winning a scholarship to Eton College. He inherited the baronetcy at the age of 15 when his father died in a hunting accident. Like his father, he also attended New College, Oxford, but after one year he joined the Scots Guards in 1941, the same year he married Barbadee Knight, and they had one son and three daughters. During the battle for Caen, in the break-out from the Normandy invasion beaches he was seriously wounded when the tank he was travelling in was hit, and he spent the next nine months on his back in hospital. During this time he read extensively to make up for his lost years at Oxford, but decided not to return to university. Instead, he joined HM Treasury where he mostly worked on winding up the affairs of the Polish government-in-exile.

Diplomatic career
In 1946 Meyer passed the Foreign Service examinations, and from 1951 to 1956 he was appointed to the British Embassy in Paris, where he became First Secretary in 1953. The subsequent appointment to the embassy in Moscow was not so enjoyable – he did not speak the language, and confined to the "diplomatic ghetto" through the Soviet government's ban on foreign contacts with its citizens, he said he did not have a job to do. He was rescued by a Soviet attempt to compromise him – he reported an attempt to lure him into a cab by a woman agent to the ambassador, who put Meyer and his family on the next plane home. Between 1958 and 1962, he worked at the Foreign Office on European political problems, at a time when the Office was changing its policy from being against the "Common Market" to in favour of Britain's joining it.

Political career

Finding a party, and a seat
The death of his mother in 1962 provided Meyer with the family's wealth, and he decided to enter politics to support his pro-European views.  In 1962, he resigned from the Foreign Office to work unpaid for the Common Market Campaign led by Liberal peer Gladwyn Jebb, 1st Baron Gladwyn. He later said that he was initially undecided whether to stand for the Conservatives or the Liberals, but his admiration for the Conservative prime minister Harold Macmillan swung his choice.

In 1963, Meyer was selected to fight the constituency of Eton and Slough, then held by Labour's leftwing internationalist Fenner Brockway. In the 1964 General Election, Meyer won the seat by 11 votes, gaining respect by ignoring his constituency party's advice to campaign on the race issue, which could have swung a number of votes in that constituency at the time. His was one of only four Conservative gains in that election. Recognising that he would only be in the seat temporarily, Meyer made the most of his time in Parliament, advocating Britain's joining the Common Market and strengthening the United Nations. He also established himself on the liberal wing of the party: voting to abolish capital punishment and for sanctions against Rhodesia. In the 1966 General Election he lost his seat to Labour's Joan Lestor by 4,663 votes.

His liberalism made him almost untouchable in the Conservative party, and his applications to stand in six constituencies (including Windsor, where he lived) were rejected, but eventually fellow Old Etonian Nigel Birch recommended Meyer to replace him in the constituency of West Flintshire, in north-eastern Wales. He returned to Parliament at the 1970 General Election.

MP for West Flintshire
Meyer became a popular MP in his new constituency, gaining a reputation for putting the interests of his constituency ahead of Conservative government policy, for example by voting against the closure of the Shotton steelworks, supporting the Airbus A300B whose wings some of his constituents built, against its all-British rival the BAC 3-11, while insisting on the importance of an effective pan-European technology. After Labour's return to power in 1974, he opposed continued sanctions against the white minority government in Rhodesia, claiming that it was intended to transfer power "forcibly to a violent minority".

When the Conservative party returned to power under Margaret Thatcher in 1979, Meyer's type of pro-Europeanism was at odds with the Euroscepticism of the bulk of the party. When his Flintshire West constituency's boundaries were expanded and redrawn to form the Clwyd North West constituency in 1983, there was an attempt by local party activists to replace him with the more Thatcherite MEP, Beata Brookes, whom Meyer managed to defeat.

Leadership challenge
On 23 November 1989, at a time of both Thatcher's and the Conservative Party's waning popularity and shortly after Nigel Lawson's resignation as chancellor, 69-year-old Meyer put himself forward as the pro-European stalking horse for the leadership of the Conservative Party. Meyer fully expected that one of the more prominent pro-Europeans such as Ian Gilmour or Michael Heseltine would take over the role; in the event, none of them did so, and Meyer had no illusions that he had any chance of success. He was derided as "Sir Anthony Whats'isname" by the pro-Thatcher Sun newspaper, who reported that he was the only Conservative MP to oppose the use of force to win back the Falkland Islands following the Argentine invasion of 1982 and had backed a number of Labour policies, including votes against Tory-led welfare benefit cuts and immigration issues. He was also slammed by the Daily Express as "Sir Nobody".

In the 1989 leadership election on 5 December, Meyer was defeated by 314 votes to 33, but when spoilt votes and abstentions were added it was discovered that 60 MPs out of 374 had failed to support Thatcher. Meyer said that "people started to think the unthinkable", and Thatcher was ousted in November 1990 to be succeeded by John Major.

On 19 January 1990, Meyer was deselected as a candidate for the 1992 general election by the Clwyd North West constituency party for his "treachery", by a 2–1 majority. The deselection campaign was enlivened by a tabloid newspaper's revelation that Meyer had for 26 years had an affair with Simone Washington, a former model and blues singer.

Post-parliamentary career 
After his forced career change in 1992 Meyer became policy director for the European Movement, and in 1998 he defected to the Pro-Euro Conservative Party before becoming a member of the Liberal Democrats. In 1999 he stood unsuccessfully, during the European Parliament elections, for the London seat.  After 1999 he became a lecturer on European affairs until his death.

Death
Meyer died of cancer, aged 84, in Kensington and Chelsea, London, in December 2004.

His son, Anthony Ashley Frank Meyer (born 1944), succeeded him in the baronetcy.

In popular culture
Meyer was portrayed by Geoffrey Wilkinson in the 2002 BBC production of Ian Curteis' controversial The Falklands Play.

Arms
 (German: I rest, I rust)

Legacy 
The Papers of Sir Anthony Meyer are housed at the British Library. The papers can be accessed through the British Library catalogue.

References

External links 
 
 
Obituary – Sir Anthony Meyer The Guardian, 8 January 2005
Obituary – Sir Anthony Meyer Times Online, 8 January 2005
Obituary – Sir Anthony Meyer Daily Telegraph, 10 January 2005

1920 births
2004 deaths
Alumni of New College, Oxford
Baronets in the Baronetage of the United Kingdom
British Army personnel of World War II
Conservative Party (UK) MPs for English constituencies
Conservative Party (UK) MPs for Welsh constituencies
Deaths from cancer in England
English people of German-Jewish descent
Government and politics of Slough
Liberal Democrats (UK) politicians
People educated at Sandroyd School
People from Slough
Politicians of the Pro-Euro Conservative Party
Scots Guards officers
UK MPs 1964–1966
UK MPs 1970–1974
UK MPs 1974
UK MPs 1974–1979
UK MPs 1979–1983
UK MPs 1983–1987
UK MPs 1987–1992
People educated at Eton College